Anarchist Federation is the name of several organisations:

Anarchist Federation (Britain)
Anarchist Federation of Britain
Anarchist Federation (France)
Anarchist Federation of Gran Canaria
Anarchist Federation (Poland)
Italian Anarchist Federation
Iberian Anarchist Federation
Japanese Anarchist Federation
Anarchist Federation (Czech republic and Slovakia)
Mexican Anarchist Federation
Anarchist Federation (Sweden)
Uruguayan Anarchist Federation

Anarchist Federations